Richard Henry Jesse (May 1, 1853 – January 21, 1921) was an American educator and the eighth president of the University of Missouri in Columbia, Missouri.  He was born in Lancaster County, Virginia 1853 and attended the University of Virginia.  He went on to teach at the University of Louisiana and Tulane University before assuming the presidency 1891.  He retired in 1908.  Jesse Hall on the David R. Francis Quadrangle is named in honor of him and was initiated as an Honorary member of the Acacia Fraternity.  He is buried in Columbia at the Columbia Cemetery.

Gallery

References

Further reading
Richard Henry Jesse: President of the University of Missouri, 1891-1908 Columbia, Mo., University of Missouri Press

 

Leaders of the University of Missouri
People from Columbia, Missouri
University of Virginia alumni
1853 births
1921 deaths
People from Lancaster County, Virginia
Tulane University faculty
Burials at Columbia Cemetery (Columbia, Missouri)